Andy Walker is the name of:

Andy Walker (basketball) (born 1955), American basketball player
Andy Walker (football manager), Middlesbrough F.C. manager from June 1910 to January 1911
Andy Walker (footballer, born 1891), Dundee and Chelsea player
Andy Walker (footballer, born 1965), Scottish footballer and TV pundit
Andy Walker (footballer, born 1981), English footballer for Maidstone United
Andy Walker (journalist) (born 1967), Canadian TV presenter and journalist

See also
Andrew Walker (disambiguation)
Walker (surname)